The Royal Belgian Entomological Society is a learned society based in Brussels. It is devoted to entomology, the study of insects. It was founded on 9 April 1855 with Edmond de Sélys Longchamps as its first president.
 
The society publishes the Bulletin, the Belgian Journal of Entomology and the Mémoires.

External links

Belgian Journal of Entomology Online

Entomological societies
Scientific organisations based in Belgium
Organisations based in Belgium with royal patronage
Organisations based in Brussels
Organizations established in 1855
1855 establishments in Belgium